Loviguié is a town in southern Ivory Coast. It is a sub-prefecture of Agboville Department in Agnéby-Tiassa Region, Lagunes District.

Loviguié was a commune until March 2012, when it became one of 1126 communes nationwide that were abolished.

In 2014, the population of the sub-prefecture of Loviguié was 17,048.

Villages
The 5 villages of the sub-prefecture of Loviguié and their population in 2014 are:
 Anno (5 858)
 Gbessé (1 833)
 Loviguié 1 (2 782)
 Loviguié 2 (4 124)
 Wahin (2 451)

References

Sub-prefectures of Agnéby-Tiassa
Former communes of Ivory Coast